Indian Ocean University; known as IOU:  (Jaamacadda Bedweynta Hindiya) is the oldest Private, nonprofit provider of accredited education University in Somalia, located in the city of Mogadishu, it was established in 1993 and is a private, non-profit institution and registered as higher education institution under the Ministry of Higher Education and Culture.

History

The 1991 civil war in Somalia caused collapse of all of the institutions including the only government run university, Somali National University, in Somalia.  Without a functional central government in Somalia, and its capacity to provide key public goods and services to its citizens, Somali intellectual group get together May 3, 1993 and decided that it’s their duty to help next generation and established Indian Ocean University; known as IOU and dedicated campus on airport road in KM4 square situated about 1 kilometers (0.6 miles) from Aden Adde International Airport in order to fill the higher education vacuum left by collapse of Somalia.

First batch of students started on September 1993 on limited academic discipline at Indian Ocean University (IOU), like Business Administration and Nursing.

Samawade Ali-Dahir is the president.

References

External links
 Indian Ocean University

Universities in Somalia
Educational institutions established in 1993
1993 establishments in Somalia
Universities in Mogadishu